Chapman Hump is a large rounded nunatak in the center of Chapman Glacier in Palmer Land, located  inland from George VI Sound. It was named by the UK Antarctic Place-Names Committee in association with Chapman Glacier.

References 

Nunataks of Palmer Land